Husakism is an ideology connected with the politician Gustáv Husák of Communist Czechoslovakia which has two different meanings and it was first used by Karol Bacílek to denounce the alleged "bourgeois nationalism" of Husák in 1950s. The later and more frequent use is for the ideology of Husák's "normalization" and federalism, the state ideology of Czechoslovakia from about 1969 to about 1989, formulated by Husák, Vasil Biľak and others.

References 

Communism in Czechoslovakia
Communist Party of Czechoslovakia
Czechoslovak Socialist Republic
Eponymous political ideologies
Gustáv Husák
Types of socialism